In geometry, The Pitot theorem in geometry states that in a tangential quadrilateral the two pairs of opposite sides have the same total length. It is named after French engineer Henri Pitot.

Statement and converse
A tangential quadrilateral is usually defined as a convex quadrilateral for which all four sides are tangent to the same inscribed circle. Pitot's theorem states that, for these quadrilaterals, the two sums of lengths of opposite sides are the same. Both sums of lengths equal the semiperimeter of the quadrilateral.

The converse implication is also true: whenever a convex quadrilateral has pairs of opposite sides with the same sums of lengths, it has an inscribed circle. Therefore, this is an exact characterization: the tangential quadrilaterals are exactly the quadrilaterals with equal sums of opposite side lengths.

Proof idea
One way to prove the Pitot theorem is to divide the sides of any given tangential quadrilateral at the points where its inscribed circle touches each side. This divides the four sides into eight segments, between a vertex of the quadrilateral and a point of tangency with the circle. Any two of these segments that meet at the same vertex have the same length, forming a pair of equal-length segments. Any two opposite sides have one segment from each of these pairs. Therefore, the four segments in two opposite sides have the same lengths, and the same sum of lengths, as the four segments in the other two opposite sides.

History
Henri Pitot proved his theorem in 1725, whereas the converse was proved by the Swiss mathematician Jakob Steiner in 1846.

Generalization
Pitot's theorem generalizes to tangential -gons, in which case the two sums of alternate sides are equal. The same proof idea applies.

References

External links
 Alexander Bogomolny, "When A Quadrilateral Is Inscriptible?" at Cut-the-knot
 "A generalization of Pitot's theorem"

Theorems about quadrilaterals and circles